The 1998 Asian Games, officially known as the 13th Asian Games and the XIII Asiad, was an Asian multi-sport event celebrated in Bangkok, Thailand from December 6 to 20, 1998, with 377 events in 36 sports and disciplines participated by 6,554 athletes across the continent. The football event commenced on 30 November 1998, a week earlier than the opening ceremony.

Bangkok was awarded the right on September 26, 1990, defeating Taipei, Taiwan and Jakarta, Indonesia to host the Games. It was the first city to hosted the Asian Games for four times, the last three editions it hosted were in 1966, 1970 and 1978. The event was opened by Bhumibol Adulyadej, the king of Thailand, at the Rajamangala Stadium.

The final medal tally was led by China, followed by South Korea, Japan and the host Thailand. Thailand set a new record with 24 gold medals. In addition, Japanese Athletics Koji Ito was announced as the most valuable player (MVP) of the Games. For Thailand, it was considered one of its remarkable achievement in sports development throughout the country's modern history.

Bidding process
Three cities bid for the Games. All three, Taipei (Chinese Taipei), Jakarta (Indonesia) and Bangkok (Thailand) submitted their formal bid in 1989. It was the first time that Thailand has presented a bid for host the Asian Games, as Bangkok was the default host of previous three games.

The vote was held on September 27, 1990, at the China Palace Tower Hotel in Beijing, China, during the 9th Olympic Council of Asia (OCA) General Assembly held during the 1990 Asian Games. All 37 members voted, with voting held in secret ballot. It was announced that Bangkok won an Asian Games bid process for the first time. Though the vote results were not released, was leaked that Bangkok won by 20-10-7.

Bangkok became the first city to have staged the Asian Games for four editions, following 1966, 1970 and 1978, and this was the first time that the city have put a bid for the event.

19 votes were needed for selection.

Development and preparation

Costs
According to United Press International news report, preparations for the games including the construction and renovation of three main stadiums and an athletes' village, cost an estimated 6 billion Thai baht (US$167 million).

Venues

Hua Mark
 Rajmangala Stadium (Opening & Closing ceremonies, Football)
 Indoor Stadium (Sepak Takraw)
 Velodrome (Cycling track)
 Shooting Range (Shooting)
 Clay Target Shooting Range (Clay Target Shooting)

Muang Thong Thani
 IMPACT Arena (Boxing)
 IMPACT Hall 1-5 (Billiards & Snooker, Gymnastics, Volleyball)
 Thunder Dome (Weightlifting)
 SCG Stadium (Rugby, Football)
 Tennis Centre (Tennis)

Thammasat University (Rangsit Centre)
 Main Stadium (Athletics and Football)
 Gymnasium 1 (Basketball, Judo, Wrestling)
 Gymnasium 2 (Badminton)
 Gymnasium 3 (Handball)
 Gymnasium 4 (Fencing)
 Gymnasium 5 (Table Tennis)
 Gymnasium 6 (Wushu)
 Gymnasium 7 (Karate, Taekwondo)
 Tennis Court (Soft Tennis)
 Field 1 (Archery)
 Field 2 (Softball)
 Aquatic Center (Aquatics)
 Athletes Village

Other venues
Bangkok and Phra Nakhon Si Ayutthaya
 Kasetsart University (Hockey)
 PS Bowling Bangkapi (Bowling)
 Suphachalasai Stadium (Football)
 Thai Army Sports Stadium (Rugby)
 Thai-Japanese Stadium (Football)
 Thupatemee Stadium (Football)

Chiang Mai
 700th Anniversary Stadium (Football)

Chonburi
 Ambassador Sport Center (Squash)
 Ao-Dongtarn Jomtien Beach (Sailing)
 Jomtian beach (Beach Volleyball)
 Map Prachan Reservoir (Canoeing, Rowing)

Nakhon Nayok
 Srinakharinwirot University (Ongkarak Campus) (Handball, Softball, Kabaddi)

Nakhon Ratchasima
 Khao Yai Rimtarn Resort (Cycling Mountain bike)
 Phahonyothin Road -(Cycling Road)
 
Nakhon Sawan
 Nakhon Sawan Province Central Stadium (Football)

Pathum Thani
 Alpine Golf and Sports Club (Golf)
 Queen Siritkit Sport Complex (Baseball, Hockey)

Saraburi
 Fort Adhisorn Riding Club (Equestrian)

Sisaket
 Sisaket Province Central Stadium (Football)

Songkhla
 Suwannawong Gymnasium Hat Yai (Sepak Takraw)
 Tinasulanon Stadium (Football)

Suphan Buri
 Municipal Gymnasium (Basketball)
 Suphan Buri Province Central Stadium (Football)

Surat Thani
 Surat Thani Province Central Stadium (Football)

Trang
 Trang Province Central Stadium (Football)
 Municipal Gymnasium (Sepak Takraw)

Marketing

Emblem
The official emblem of the games combines elements from Thai stupas and pagodas, the letter "A", which means either "Asia" or "Athletes", and the logo of the OCA. It symbolises the knowledge, intelligence and athletic prowess of Thailand's forefathers.

Mascot

The official mascot of the games is an elephant named Chai-Yo, the equivalent of "hurrah" in Thai and a symbol of unity and solidarity. Elephants are known and admired among Thais for their strength and nobility.

The Games

Opening ceremony

The opening ceremony started at 17:00 local time on December 6, 1998. It was attended by King of Thailand, Bhumibol Adulyadej, President of the International Olympic Committee Juan Antonio Samaranch and President of the OCA Sheikh Ahmed Al-Fahad Al-Ahmed Al-Sabah. The nations entered in alphabetic order of their country names in Thai during the parade of nations.

Participating nations
National Olympic Committees (NOCs) are named according to their official IOC designations and arranged according to their official IOC country codes in 1998.

 was not attending due to the fact that the tournament period overlaps with Ramadan and that there is a big national event in the country, but it was pointed out that it was because diplomatic relations between Thailand were deteriorated by the Blue Diamond Affair. However paraded in the Opening Ceremony.

Sports 

Aquatics
 (4)
 (32)
 (2)
 (1)
 (4)
 (45)
 (7)
 (1)
 (2)
 (10)
 (12)
 (12)
 (10)
 (15)
 (6)
 (10)
 (2)
 (2)
 (4)
 (16)
 (2)
 (14)
 (1)
 (11)
 (11)
 (2)
 (16)
 (6)
 (34)
 (1)
 (4)
 (2)
 (7)
 (16)
 (7)
Volleyball
 (2)
 (2)
 (15)
 (16)
 (11)

Demonstration
 (2)
 (11)

Medal table 

The top ten ranked NOCs at these Games are listed below. The host nation, Thailand, is highlighted.

See also
 1999 FESPIC Games

References

External links
 1998 Asian Games official website
 1998 Asian Games result system
 Sadec 1998 Asian Games Site
 Kompas Indonesia Games Coverage site
 Asian Games Language Selection Site

 
Asian Games
Asian Games
Asian Games
Asian Games
Summer
Asian Games by year
Asian Games